Rawlins is a city in Carbon County, Wyoming, United States. The population was 8,221 at the 2020 census. It is the county seat of Carbon County. It was named for Union General John Aaron Rawlins, who camped in the locality in 1867.

Demographics

2010 census
As of the census of 2010, there were 9,259 people, 3,443 households, and 2,206 families living in the city. The racial makeup of the city was 84.7% White, 1.1% African American, 1.3% Native American, 1.0% Asian, 0.1% Pacific Islander, 9.2% from other races, and 2.7% from two or more races. Hispanic or Latino of any race were 24.3% of the population.

There were 3,443 households, of which 35.5% had children under the age of 18 living with them, 48.2% were married couples living together, 10.2% had a female householder with no husband present, 5.6% had a male householder with no wife present, and 35.9% were non-families. 29.0% of all households were made up of individuals, and 7.3% had someone living alone who was 65 years of age or older. The average household size was 2.47 and the average family size was 3.04.

The median age in the city was 34.3 years. 25.5% of residents were under the age of 18; 9.5% were between the ages of 18 and 24; 29% were from 25 to 44; 26.8% were from 45 to 64; and 9.3% were 65 years of age or older. The gender makeup of the city was 54.7% male and 45.3% female.

2000 census
As of the census of 2000, there were 8,538 people, 3,320 households, and 2,237 families living in the city. The population density was 1,153.4 people per square mile (445.5/km2). There were 3,860 housing units at an average density of 521.4 per square mile (201.4/km2). The racial makeup of the city was 85.86% White, 0.81% African American, 1.46% Native American, 0.84% Asian, 0.09% Pacific Islander, 8.28% from other races, and 2.65% from two or more races. Hispanic or Latino of any race were 21.05% of the population.

There were 3,320 households, out of which 33.9% had children under the age of 18 living with them, 52.6% were married couples living together, 10.5% had a female householder with no husband present, and 32.6% were non-families. 26.9% of all households were made up of individuals, and 8.6% had someone living alone who was 65 years of age or older. The average household size was 2.45 and the average family size was 2.97.

In the city, the population was spread out, with 26.0% under the age of 18, 10.1% from 18 to 24, 29.4% from 25 to 44, 24.2% from 45 to 64, and 10.3% who were 65 years of age or older. The median age was 36 years. For every 100 females, there were 111.5 males. For every 100 females age 18 and over, there were 112.8 males.

The median income for a household in the city was $36,600, and the median income for a family was $42,137. Males had a median income of $33,179 versus $22,580 for females. The per capita income for the city was $17,887. About 10.4% of families and 13.7% of the population were below the poverty line, including 18.2% of those under age 18 and 17.7% of those age 65 or over.

Geography
Rawlins is located in Carbon County at  (41.790397, -107.234297).

The city is approximately 6800 feet (2073 m) above sea level.

Climate 
Rawlins' climate is semi-arid (Köppen climate classification BSk).

Government and infrastructure
The Wyoming Department of Corrections Wyoming State Penitentiary is located in Rawlins. The facility was operated by the Wyoming Board of Charities and Reform until that agency was dissolved as a result of a state constitutional amendment passed in November 1990.

The United States Postal Service operates the Rawlins Post Office.

Education
Residents are zoned to schools in the Carbon County School District#1

All residents are zoned to Rawlins Elementary School (elementary students formerly went to either Pershing, Mountain VIew, Sunny Side, or Highlands Hills Elementary School), Rawlins Middle School and Rawlins High School; Rawlins also offers an alternative school, the Carbon County Co-operative High School.

Western Wyoming Community College also offers outreach programs through the Carbon County Higher Education Center. The main campus is housed in the former Sunny Side Elementary School building.

Rawlins has a public library, a branch of the Carbon County Library System.

Media
Rawlins is served by one print newspaper, the Rawlins Daily Times.

The town's two radio stations, KRAL and KIQZ have both been silent for some time. The stations are owned by Mt. Rushmore Broadcasting, Inc. Sources connected to the FCC say, "...that any station owned or operated by Mt. Rushmore Broadcasting will "not likely" have their licenses renewed once they expire, due to the history of "past violations and cavalier attitude(s) towards following and maintaining" rules and regulations, and that this and other Mt. Rushmore stations could have their broadcasting rights taken away "at almost any moment." In early 2015, it was reported that staff had unexpectedly resigned, and there was difficulty finding new employees.

Transportation

Highways

Interstate highways:

 I-80
 East–west interstate running from New York City to San Francisco. I-80 runs through the south side of Rawlins, leading east  to Laramie and west  to Rock Springs. The I-80 business loop runs through the center of Rawlins, following Cedar Street before turning north onto Third Street, and then west onto Spruce Street.

U.S. highways:

 US 30
 Runs concurrent with I-80. The US-30 business loop also runs concurrent with the I-80 business loop.

 US 287
 Runs through Rawlins on east Cedar Street before moving north onto North Higley Boulevard (the 287 bypass). Leads northwest  to Lander and east with I-80 to Laramie.

Wyoming state highways:

 WYO 71
 Starts at CR401 near Teton Reservoir and travels through southern parts of Rawlins until ending at Wyoming 78 near I-80 exit 214.

 WYO 78
 Wyoming Highway 78, also known as South Higley Boulevard, begins at the Wyoming State Penitentiary south of Rawlins, until ending at Wyoming 71 near I-80 exit 214.

 WYO 789
 Runs concurrent with the I-80 business loop via Spruce Street before turning north on Third Street. Wyoming 789 meets US 287 north of town, where it runs concurrent with this highway.

Scheduled bus service
Scheduled bus service is offered by Greyhound Bus Lines.

Airport
The city of Rawlins is served by Rawlins Municipal Airport (Harvey Field).

"Rawlins Red"
"Rawlins Red" is a red pigment containing hematite, an oxide of iron that was mined near Rawlins. Paint containing Rawlins Red has anti-rust properties and is thought to have been used as the original paint on the Brooklyn Bridge.

Republic of Texas
Rawlins displays a historical marker denoting the northernmost border of the Republic of Texas, which claimed land as far north as Carbon County.

Notable people
 William L. Carlisle (1890–1964), one of America's last train robbers, imprisoned in Wyoming State Penitentiary
 Jesse Garcia (born 1982), actor who starred in Quinceañera
 Big Nose George (1834–1881), Wild West outlaw hanged by a lynch mob in Rawlins 
 Lillian Heath (1865–1962), the first female doctor in Wyoming; she was given the cap of Big Nose George's skull at his autopsy
 John J. Hickey (1911–1970), U.S. senator from Wyoming and governor of Wyoming
 Cindy Hill (born 1962), Wyoming Superintendent of Public Instruction since 2011, spent her sixth grade in school in Rawlins
 Mike Lansing (born 1968), professional baseball player
 Russ Leatherman (born 1962), voice of Mr. Moviefone
Ember Oakley, prosecutor and member of the Wyoming House of Representatives
 John Eugene Osborne (1858–1943), third governor of Wyoming, U.S. representative for Wyoming
 Larry Wilcox (born 1947), co-star of the popular 1970s TV show CHiPs; born in San Diego and raised in Rawlins

References

External links
 
 City of Rawlins Official Website

 
Cities in Carbon County, Wyoming
Cities in Wyoming
County seats in Wyoming